The IBM 729 Magnetic Tape Unit was IBM's iconic tape mass storage system from the late 1950s through the mid-1960s.  Part of the IBM 7 track family of tape units, it was used on late 700, most 7000 and many 1400 series computers. Like its predecessor, the IBM 727 and many successors, the 729 used 1/2 inch (12.7 mm) magnetic tape up to 2400 feet (730 m) long wound on reels up to 10½ inch (267 mm) diameter. To allow rapid tape acceleration (and thus reduced seek/access times), long vacuum columns were placed between the tape reels and the read/write heads to absorb sudden increases in tape tension which would otherwise break the tape. Write protection was provided by a removable plastic ring in the back of the tape reel.

Data format
The tape had seven parallel tracks, six for data and one to maintain parity. Tapes with character data (BCD) were recorded in even parity. Binary tapes used odd parity (709 manual, p. 20). Aluminum strips were glued several feet from the ends of the tape to serve as physical beginning and end of tape markers. Write protection was provided by a removable plastic ring in the back of the tape reel. A 3/4 inch gap between records allowed the mechanism enough time to stop the tape. Initial tape speed was 75 inches per second (2.95 m/s) and recording density was 200 characters per inch, giving a payload transfer speed of 90 kbit/s (105 kbit/s including parity bits). Later 729 models supported 556 and 800 characters/inch and 112.5 in/s (payload transfer rates up to 540 kbit/s; raw transfer rates up to 630 kbit/s). At 200 characters per inch, a single 2400 foot tape could store the equivalent of some 50,000 punched cards (about 4,000,000 six-bit bytes, a data quantity equivalent to three million octets).

The 729 series was superseded by 9 track tape drives introduced with the IBM System/360.

Models

729 I
The IBM 729 I was introduced for the IBM 709 and IBM 705 III computers, looked identical to the IBM 727, and used vacuum tubes. The main improvement was the use of a dual gap head permitting write verify.

729 II
The IBM 729 II was introduced for the IBM 7000 series computers, introducing a new cabinet style and transistorized circuitry. Supported dual density (200, 556).

729 III
High speed (112.5 in/s) single density (556).

729 IV
High speed (112.5 in/s) dual density (200, 556).

729 V
High density (800).

729 VI
High speed (112.6 in/s) high density (800). Introduced September 1961.

See also
 IBM 7330, a less expensive 7 track tape drive

References 

 IBM 709 Data Processing System, Form A22-6501-0

External links
 Bitsavers.org Magnetic Tape Equipment manuals (PDF files)
 Debugging the 1959 IBM 729 Vacuum Column Tape Drive at the Computer History Museum, YouTube 20 April 2016

729
729
Tape 729